Usonia is a word that was used by American architect Frank Lloyd Wright to refer to the United States in general (in preference to America), and more specifically to his vision for the landscape of the country, including the planning of cities and the architecture of buildings. Wright proposed the use of the adjective Usonian to describe the particular New World character of the American landscape as distinct and free of previous architectural conventions.

Usonian houses

"Usonian" usually refers to a group of approximately 60 middle-income family homes designed by Frank Lloyd Wright beginning in 1934 with the Willey House, with most considering the Herbert and Katherine Jacobs First House, 1937, to be the first true "Usonian."  The "Usonian Homes" are typically small, single-story dwellings without a garage or much storage.  They are often L-shaped to fit around a garden terrace on unusual and inexpensive sites.  They are characterized by native materials; flat roofs and large cantilevered overhangs for passive solar heating and natural cooling; natural lighting with clerestory windows; and radiant-floor heating. Another distinctive feature is that they typically have little exposure to the front/'public' side, while the rear/'private' sides are completely open to the outside.  A strong visual connection between the interior and exterior spaces is an important characteristic of all Usonian homes. The word carport was coined by Wright to describe an overhang for sheltering a parked vehicle.

The Usonia Historic District is a planned community in Pleasantville, New York built in the 1950s following this concept. Wright designed 3 of the 47 homes himself.

Variants of the Jacobs House design are still in existence today. The Usonian design is considered among the aesthetic origins of the ranch-style house popular in the American west of the 1950s.

According to plans that Wright created in 1939, Florida Southern College constructed in 2013 the 13th Wright building on their campus. The  building includes textile-block construction, colored glass in perforated concrete blocks, Wright photographs, a documentary film about the architect's work at the school, and furniture designed by Wright.  Named the "Usonian House", it was originally designed as one of twenty faculty housing units. The building is home to the Sharp Family Tourism and Education Center, a visitor center for guests visiting campus to see the collection of Frank Lloyd Wright buildings known as Child of the Sun.

Origin of the word

The word Usonian appears to have been coined by James Duff Law, a Scottish writer born in 1865. In a miscellaneous collection, Here and There in Two Hemispheres (1903), Law quoted a letter of his own (dated June 18, 1903) that begins "We of the United States, in justice to Canadians and Mexicans, have no right to use the title 'Americans' when referring to matters pertaining exclusively to ourselves." He went on to acknowledge that some author had proposed "Usona", but that he preferred the form "Usonia". Perhaps the earliest published use by Wright was in 1927:

However, this may be a misattribution, as there is as yet no other published evidence that Butler ever used the word.

José F. Buscaglia reclaims the term Usonian to refer to the peoples, national ideology and neo-imperial tradition of the United States of America.

Miguel Torres-Castro uses the term Usonian to refer to the origin of the Atlantic puffin used in the children's book Jupu the Puffin: A Usonian Story. The bird is a puffin from Maine, US.

Noted Usonian houses

Precursor to Usonians
Malcolm Willey House 1934, Minneapolis, Minnesota
Peters-Margedant House* 1934, University of Evansville, Evansville, Indiana.
Benjamin Rebhuhn House 1937, Great Neck Estates, New York

Usonian Houses
 Herbert and Katherine Jacobs First House, "Jacobs I," 1937, Madison, Wisconsin
 Paul and Jean Hanna House, "Honeycomb House," 1937, Palo Alto, California
 Andrew F.H. Armstrong House 1939, Ogden Dunes, Indiana
 Joseph Euchtman House 1939, Baltimore, Maryland
 Bernard Schwartz House 1939, Two Rivers, Wisconsin
 George Sturges House 1939, Los Angeles, California
 John and Ruth Pew House 1939, Shorewood Hills, Wisconsin
 Hause House 1939, Lansing, Michigan
 Sidney Bazett House (also known as the Bazett-Frank House) 1940 Hillsborough, California
 Goetsch–Winckler House 1940, Okemos, Michigan
 Gregor S. and Elizabeth B. Affleck House 1940 Bloomfield Hills, Michigan
 Rosenbaum House 1940, Florence, Alabama
 Theodore Baird Residence 1940, Amherst, Massachusetts
 Clarence Sondern House 1940, Kansas City, Missouri
 Pope–Leighey House 1941, Alexandria, Virginia
 Stuart Richardson House 1941 (built 1951) Glen Ridge, New Jersey
 Alvin Miller House (also known as the Alvin and Inez Miller residence) 1946, Charles City, Iowa
 Erling P. Brauner House 1948, Okemos, Michigan
 Usonia Homes, Pleasantville, New York
 Sol Friedman House 1949
 Edward Serlin House 1951
 Roland Reisley House 1951
 Melvyn Maxwell and Sara Stein Smith House 1949, Bloomfield Hills, Michigan
 Robert and Rae Levin House 1949, Kalamazoo, Michigan
 Weltzheimer/Johnson House 1949, Oberlin, Ohio
 Donald Schaberg House 1950, Okemos, Michigan
 Karl A. Staley House 1950, North Madison, Ohio
 J.A. Sweeton Residence 1950, Cherry Hill, New Jersey
 Seamour and Gertrude Shavin House 1950 Chattanooga, Tennessee
 Lowell and Agnes Walter House 1950, Quasqueton, Iowa
 Kraus House 1950, Kirkwood, Missouri
 Kenneth and Phyllis Laurent House 1951, Rockford, Illinois
 Nathan Rubin House 1951, Canton, Ohio
 Muirhead Farmhouse 1951, Hampshire, Illinois
 Zimmerman House 1951, Manchester, New Hampshire
 John D. Haynes House 1952, Fort Wayne, Indiana
 Frank S. Sander House 1952, Stamford, Connecticut
 Kentuck Knob 1953, Stewart Township, Fayette County, Pennsylvania
 John and Syd Dobkins House 1953, Canton, Ohio
 Bachman–Wilson House 1954, Millstone, New Jersey
 Ellis Feiman House 1954, Canton, Ohio
 John E. Christian House "Samara" 1954, West Lafayette, Indiana
 J. Willis Hughes house "Fountainhead", 1954, Jackson, Mississippi
 William L. Thaxton Jr. House 1955, Houston, Texas
 Louis Penfield House 1955, Willoughby Hills, Ohio 
 Cedric G. and Patricia Neils Boulter House 1956, Cincinnati, Ohio
 Dudley Spencer House 1956, Wilmington, Delaware
 Donald C. Duncan House 1957, Donegal, Pennsylvania (dismantled and relocated from its original location in Lisle, Illinois)
 Evelyn and Conrad Gordon House 1957, Wilsonville, Oregon (later moved to Silverton, Oregon)
 Lovness House and Cottage 1957, Stillwater, Minnesota
 Robert H. Sunday House 1957, Marshalltown, Iowa
 John Gillin Residence 1958, Dallas, Texas
 Paul J. and Ida Trier House 1958, Johnston, Iowa

Usonian Automatic Houses
The Usonian Automatic houses were made with concrete blocks. An attempt on the part of Wright to further lower the cost of housing, the clients could actually be involved in the creation of the blocks and thus the construction of the building (such as in the Tracy House).

 Benjamin Adelman Residence 1951, Phoenix, Arizona
 Arthur Pieper Residence 1952, Paradise Valley, Arizona
 Gerald B. and Beverley Tonkens House 1954, Amberley Village, Hamilton County, Ohio
 Toufic H. Kalil House 1955, Manchester, New Hampshire 
 Theodore A. Pappas House 1955, Town and Country, Missouri
 Tracy House 1956, Normandy Park, Washington 
 Dorothy H. Turkel House 1956, Detroit, Michigan

See also
 Usonia Historic District
 Polychrome Historic District, a similar effort to provide inexpensive housing, by John Joseph Earley

Notes

References

External links

 Frank Lloyd Wright: Usonian House at PBS.org
 Usonia: Frank Lloyd Wright's Vision for America at Columbia University
 Inspiring Communities—Usonia
 The Post Usonian Project
 List of Usonian houses at archinform.net
Specific houses
 John D. Haynes House
 Jones House
 Jacobs House
 The John and Catherine Christian House
 Pope-Leighey House, Usonian house in Alexandria, Virginia, open to the public
 Weltzheimer/Johnson House, Usonian house in Oberlin, Ohio, open to the public
 Rosenbaum House, Florence Alabama
 Building the Usonian House at Florida Southern College

1900s neologisms
Frank Lloyd Wright buildings
American culture
New Urbanism